The Slow and fast passenger trains are passenger train services of Indian Railways which connect small towns and cities to metropolitan cities in India. The classification Passenger means it is an ordinary passenger train which halts at all or most of the stations on the railway routes. Currently, a total of 3572 passenger trains are running of all railway zones of Indian Railways.

History
The country's first passenger train ran in Western India between Bombay Bori Bunder (now Chhatrapati Shivaji Terminus) and Thane on 16 April 1853. The 14-carriage train was hauled by three steam locomotives: the Sahib, Sindh, and Sultan. Travelling , the train carried 400 people. The passenger line was built and operated by the Great Indian Peninsula Railway (GIPR). It was built in  broad gauge, which became the country's standard for railways. The line was built and operated by the East Indian Railway Company (EIR). It was built and operated by the Madras Railway.

First electric passenger train in the country, ran from Victoria Terminus (now Chhatrapati Shivaji Terminus) to Kurla on the Harbour Branch of Great Indian Peninsula Railway on 3 February 1925 using 1500 V DC overhead traction.
In 1957, the first diesel passenger train ran in the country.

In 1993, the Integral Coach Factory started production of DMU's and MEMUs. After productions of both series, the first MEMU train started running between Asansol and Burdwan (now Barddhaman) on 11 July 1994. And later, the first DEMU train was started running between Jalandhar and Hoshiarpur on 23 October 1994.

Types

Trains are classified into four types:
 Slow passenger train: Locomotive-hauled. Stop at every station on the route, except abandoned ones.
 Fast passenger train: Locomotive-hauled. Skip some stops on the route, usually least-booked ones.
 Diesel Electric Multiple Unit (DEMU):  Multiple Units. Stop at every station on the route.
 Mainline Electric Multiple Unit (MEMU): Multiple Units. Stop at every station on the route. Will replace locomotive-hauled trains on electrified routes.

In some cases, trains run as fast passengers on one section, while running as slow passengers on another section. Fast passenger trains generally run on longer routes as compared to slow passenger trains. These trains have unreserved coaches, for short-distance unreserved seating coaches are used and for long-distance both unreserved sleeper and seating coaches are used.

The slow and fast passenger trains are usually hauled by locomotives such as WAM-4, WAG-5, WAG-7, for electrified routes and WDM-2 for non-electrified/semi-electrified routes. On the other hand, the DEMUs and MEMUs are multiple units, have cabs at both ends, resulting in quicker turnaround times, reduced crewing costs, and enhanced safety. So, IR is progressively replacing all locomotive-hauled slow and fast passenger and intercity trains with DEMUs and MEMUs, starting from North Western Railway zone on 1 October 2015.

Trivia
Longest-running

Shortest-running

Gallery 

Exteriors

Interiors

See also

 High-speed rail in India
 Express trains in India
 MEMU
 Suburban trains

References

External links
 Time Table of Slow and Fast Passenger Trains
 Time Table of Diesel Electric Multiple Unit Trains (DEMU)
 Time Table of Mainline Electric Multiple Unit Trains (MEMU)